Cinta Dalam Sepotong Roti (English: Love in a Slice of Bread) is a 1991 Indonesian road film directed by Garin Nugroho. The film was later adapted into a novel of the same title by an Indonesian novelist Fira Basuki and starred by Adjie Massaid, Monica Oemardi, Tio Pakusadewo and Rizky Erzet Teo. Subsequently, the film manage to earning a Citra Award for Best Film at the 1991 Indonesian Film Festival.

Plot
Mayang, Harris and Topan are good friends since childhood. Mayang, a columnist in a female magazine, has been married to Harris, a professional, while Topan is still single and a photographer. When Mayang and Harris go on a vacation to solve their sexual problem in their marriage. Topan is invited to join them. On the trip, the problems of the three friends unravel. Harris has sexual difficulties because of his past trauma and though Mayang tries to understand and is sympathetic, it doesn't help. Then Topan still harbours his childhood love for Mayang. Finally, Harris is suspicious towards Mayang and Topan.

Cast
Adjie Massaid as Harris 
Monica Oemardi   
Tio Pakusadewo as Topan 
Rizky Erzet Teo as Mayang

External links
 
 

Citra Award winners
1991 films
Best Film Citra Award winners
1990s Indonesian-language films
1990s drama road movies
Indonesian drama road movies
Films directed by Garin Nugroho
Films shot in Indonesia
1991 drama films